In mathematics, the Gaussian isoperimetric inequality, proved by Boris Tsirelson and Vladimir Sudakov, and later independently by Christer Borell, states that among all sets of given Gaussian measure in the n-dimensional Euclidean space, half-spaces have the minimal Gaussian boundary measure.

Mathematical formulation 
Let  be a measurable subset of  endowed with the standard Gaussian measure  with the density . Denote by 
 

the ε-extension of A. Then the Gaussian isoperimetric inequality states that

 

where

Proofs and generalizations 
The original proofs by Sudakov, Tsirelson and Borell were based on Paul Lévy's spherical isoperimetric inequality.

Sergey Bobkov proved a functional generalization of the Gaussian isoperimetric inequality, from a certain "two point analytic inequality". Bakry and Ledoux gave another proof of Bobkov's functional inequality based on the semigroup techniques which works in a much more abstract setting. Later Barthe and Maurey gave yet another proof using the Brownian motion.

The Gaussian isoperimetric inequality also follows from Ehrhard's inequality.

See also 
 Concentration of measure
 Borell–TIS inequality

References 

Probabilistic inequalities